Pind Brahmanan is a village of Sialkot District in the Punjab province of Pakistan. It is located at 32°27'0N 75°1'0E with an altitude of 284 metres (approximately 932 
feet) lying in the east of the district.

References

Villages in Sialkot District